Aurea Francesca "Cesca" Racraquin (born October 5, 1996) is a Filipino volleyball player of the collegiate varsity volleyball team of San Beda College that plays in the NCAA. Cesca played for the Creamline Cool Smashers in the Premier Volleyball League that debuted during the 2017 PVL Reinforced Conference.

Career 
Racraquin won the NCAA Season 92 Rookie of the Year award before joining the Creamline Cool Smashers club that won the 2017 reinforced and open conferences' bronze medals. In the second season (2018) of the Premier Volleyball League, Racraquin transferred to Pocari Sweat Lady Warriors.

Personal life 
Racraquin finished high school at the University of the East Caloocan and is currently studying in San Beda University. She also studied in De La Salle University and was a member of the Lady Archers volleyball team.

Filmography

Television

Awards

Individuals 
 2016 NCAA Season 92 "Rookie of the Year"

Clubs 
 2017 Premier Volleyball League 1st Season Reinforced Open Conference –  Bronze medal, with Creamline Cool Smashers
 2017 Premier Volleyball League 1st Season Open Conference -  Bronze medal, with Creamline Cool Smashers

References

Living people
Filipino women's volleyball players
1996 births
San Beda University alumni
De La Salle University alumni
Sportspeople from Quezon City
University of the East alumni
Volleyball players from Metro Manila
Wing spikers
Liberos
National Collegiate Athletic Association (Philippines) players
University Athletic Association of the Philippines volleyball players
Outside hitters